The Department is a 2015 Nigerian romantic crime action film directed by Remi Vaughan-Richards, starring Majid Michel, OC Ukeje, Desmond Elliot, Osas Ighodaro, Jide Kosoko, Seun Akindele, Somkele Iyamah, Funky Mallam and Kenneth Okolie The film which is the first feature film from Inkblot Productions and Closer Pictures, produced by Uduak Oguamanam and Chinaza Onuzo.

The film tells the story of a secret department in a business conglomerate, as its gang members blackmail top executives into selling their companies to the leader of the conglomerate (Jide Kosoko). Two lovers (Majid Michel and Osas Ighodaro) however opt out of the organization, but the group wants her back for one last job. She accepts against her husband's will, who consequently decides to sabotage the department in order to save their marriage.

Cast
Osas Ighodaro as Tolu Okoye
Majid Michel as Nnamdi
Desmond Elliot as Effiong
OC Ukeje as Segun
Jide Kosoko as Chief
Udoka Oyeka as James Okolo
Kenneth Okolie
Somkele Iyamah as
Seun Akindele as
Saheed Funky Mallam as

Release
A theatrical trailer for The Department was released on 29 December 2014. The film had a press screening on 20 January 2015 at Filmhouse Cinemas in Surulere, Lagos; it was reportedly well received by the critics at the event. It premiered on 25 January 2015, and was theatrically released on 30 January 2015.

Reception
Nollywood Reinvented rated the film 62%, praising the story and the performances, but noted that the film lacks emotional connection with the viewers; it commented "With a stellar cast and its not-the-usual storyline, The Department aspires to so much and achieves a lot but it does not achieve it all. The movie did great work with the little details, however, together the finished work falls flat and will probably be forgotten by your next breakfast". Folasewa Olatunde praised the performances in the film, but talked down on some unrealistic parts of the film. She concludes that the film is "intriguing and suspense filled".

References

External links

English-language Nigerian films
2015 crime action films
2010s romance films
Nigerian action films
Nigerian crime films
Nigerian romance films
Films set in Lagos
Films set in Ibadan
Films shot in Lagos
Films about revenge
Romantic crime films
2010s English-language films